Tom Gizzi  is a former American football lineman who played two seasons in the Arena Football League with the Pittsburgh Gladiators/Tampa Bay Storm. He played college football at the University of Pennsylvania and attended La Salle College High School in Wyndmoor, Pennsylvania.

College career
Gizzi played for the Penn Quakers from 1985 to 1988. He was an All-Ivy League First Team selection, helping the Quakers win three Ivy League titles in 1985, 1986 and 1988. He was a team captain as a senior in 1988 and picked up Honorable Mention All-America and All-ECAC honors in addition to league honors.

Professional career
Gizzi played for the Pittsburgh Gladiators/Tampa Bay Storm from 1990 to 1991. In 1991, Gizzi earned Second Team All-Arena honors as the Storm won ArenaBowl V against the Detroit Drive on August 17, 1991.

Coaching career
Gizza was head girls' basketball coach at The Hill School in Pottstown, Pennsylvania and McDonogh School in Owings Mills, Maryland. He also served as assistant coach for the Loyola Greyhounds women's basketball team.

References

External links
Just Sports Stats

Living people
Year of birth missing (living people)
American football offensive linemen
American football defensive linemen
Penn Quakers football players
Pittsburgh Gladiators players
Tampa Bay Storm players
High school basketball coaches in the United States
Loyola Greyhounds women's basketball coaches
American women's basketball coaches
The Hill School faculty